This is a list of current Roman Catholic churches in the Roman Catholic Archdiocese of Portland in Oregon. The Archdiocese serves all 412,725 Catholics in Oregon, west of the Cascade Mountains. The cathedral church of the archdiocese is St. Mary's Cathedral of the Immaculate Conception.

Cathedrals

Monasteries

Parish Churches

References 

Archdiocese of Portland in Oregon
Roman Catholic Archdiocese